What We Saw from the Cheap Seats is the sixth studio album by American alternative singer-songwriter Regina Spektor.  On November 21, 2011, Spektor posted on her Facebook page that the album had been recorded with Mike Elizondo in Los Angeles during the summer of 2011. It was released on May 29, 2012. The album is a collection of new material alongside the first studio recordings of several songs Spektor had previously only performed live.

By the time of the album's release, "Jessica" was the only song that was entirely new to fans: an earlier recording of "Don't Leave Me (Ne Me Quitte Pas)" had been included on Spektor's album Songs, and the rest of the songs had already been performed live, with "How" and "The Party" making their debut just weeks earlier.

Singles and promotion
The album's first single, "All the Rowboats", was released for streaming on February 27, 2012, and for digital download the following day. It was featured prominently on the episode of the CW's Ringer that aired on March 13, 2012, making Spektor the "Artist Spotlight" of the week. The second single, "Don't Leave Me (Ne Me Quitte Pas)", is a new version of "Ne Me Quitte Pas", a song originally from Spektor's 2002 album Songs. Music videos were produced for both of these songs.

On October 16, 2012, "How" was released as the third single from the album.

Spektor undertook two tours in support of the album. The first was a tour of the southern US, on which Spektor opened for Tom Petty and the Heartbreakers for eight shows in April and May 2012. The second was an international tour that opened with three sold-out shows in New York City, Boston, and Philadelphia, at which Only Son, a band led by Spektor's husband Jack Dishel, was the opening act. This tour extended to several European countries (including Russia, to which Spektor had not traveled since emigrating from it as a child) and ran through the summer of 2012.

To promote the album, Spektor performed on the Late Show with David Letterman, Good Morning America, The Colbert Report, and VH1; did an interview with the New York Times; and did a special "Live on YouTube" engagement.

Critical reception

Similarly to Spektor's previous studio albums, What We Saw from the Cheap Seats received a favorable reaction upon its release. On review-aggregation website Metacritic, it has a score of 73 out of 100, based on 28 reviews, which indicates "generally favorable reviews".

Several critics praised the unique quirkiness of the album, with Will Hermes of Rolling Stone, who gave it 3.5 out of 5 stars, claiming that the album "may be [Spektor's] best," and made Spektor "her generation's Joni Mitchell. A staff reviewer for Sputnikmusic gave the album the maximum 5 out of 5 stars, writing that it is Spektor's "best effort yet," and that "an artist who could already seemingly do no wrong went and became even more perfect."
American Songwriter wrote that "Cheap Seats as a whole [...] points toward ever unfolding new directions for an artist whose sense of whimsy never excludes the possibility of real-world despair."

Commercial performance
In the United States, the album debuted at number three on the Billboard 200, with sales of 42,000 (this was the same rank, but a slight decrease in sales from the opening of Spektor's previous studio album, Far).  As of September 2016, the album had sold 174,000 copies in the United States.

Track listing
All songs written by Spektor except where noted.

Deluxe edition bonus tracks

Personnel
All credits for tracks one through eleven are listed in the album's booklet.
 Regina Spektor - vocals, piano (1-10), keyboards (2-10), marimba (3), co-producer, songwriter
 Mike Elizondo - producer, bass (1, 3, 5, 7-10), upright bass (2, 4, 6), electric guitar (1, 6, 7), acoustic guitars (11), programming (3, 5, 7)
 Aaron Sterling - drums (1, 3-7, 9), percussion (1, 5, 7), marimba (3)
 Jay Bellerose - drums (2, 7, 10), percussion (2, 10), bongos (10)
 Danny T. Levin - trumpet (3)
 David Moyer - baritone and tenor saxophone (3)
 Jack Dishel - vocals (3, 5)
 John Daversa - trumpet (10)

Additional personnel
Art Direction, Design – Stephen Walker (6)
Co-producer – Regina Spektor
Engineer – Adam Hawkins
Engineer [Assistant] – Brent Arrowood
Management – Ron Shapiro
Management [Business] – Errol Wander
Mastered By – Bob Ludwig
Photography By – Shervin Lainez
Producer – Mike Elizondo
Written-By – Regina Spektor

Charts

Weekly charts

Year-end charts

Singles

References

External links
François Villon's Prayer, Track 13, in Russian and English
Old Jacket (Stariy Pidjak), Track 14, translated into English

2012 albums
Regina Spektor albums
Sire Records albums
Albums produced by Mike Elizondo